Joseco is an extinct town in Lincoln County, in the U.S. state of Nevada.

History
A post office was in operation at Joseco from 1916 until 1943.  Joseco is derived from "Joseph", so named after a Mormon leader.

References

Ghost towns in Lincoln County, Nevada